Neustadt (Aisch)-Bad Windsheim (German: Landkreis Neustadt an der Aisch-Bad Windsheim, official Landkreis Neustadt a.d.Aisch-Bad Windsheim) is a Landkreis (district) in Bavaria, Germany. It is bounded by (from the west and clockwise) the districts of Würzburg, Kitzingen, Bamberg, Erlangen-Höchstadt, Fürth and Ansbach, and by the state of Baden-Württemberg (district Main-Tauber).

History
The district was established in 1972 by merging the former districts of Neustadt (Aisch), Uffenheim and Scheinfeld.

Geography
The district is covered by the Steigerwald and Frankenhöhe nature parks, both comprising large forested and hilly areas. The Aisch, a small affluent of the Regnitz River, runs through the district from southwest to northeast, with all main towns of the district on its banks.

Economy
In 2017 (latest data available) the GDP per inhabitant was €29,307. This places the district 82nd out of 96 districts (rural and urban) in Bavaria (overall average: €46,698).

Coat of arms
The coat of arms displays:
 the dog from the arms of the margraves of Nuremberg
 the eagle from the arms of the Hohenzollern dynasty
 the blue and white bars from the lords of Seinsheim

Towns and municipalities

Towns:
 Bad Windsheim
 Burgbernheim
 Neustadt an der Aisch
 Scheinfeld
 Uffenheim

Municipalities:

 Baudenbach
 Burghaslach
 Dachsbach
 Diespeck
 Dietersheim
 Emskirchen
 Ergersheim
 Gallmersgarten
 Gerhardshofen
 Gollhofen
 Gutenstetten
 Hagenbüchach
 Hemmersheim
 Illesheim
 Ippesheim
 Ipsheim
 Langenfeld
 Markt Bibart
 Markt Erlbach
 Markt Nordheim
 Markt Taschendorf
 Marktbergel
 Münchsteinach
 Neuhof an der Zenn
 Oberickelsheim
 Obernzenn
 Oberscheinfeld
 Simmershofen
 Sugenheim
 Trautskirchen
 Uehlfeld
 Weigenheim
 Wilhelmsdorf

References

External links

 Official website (German)

 
Districts of Bavaria